Lake Pucacocha (possibly from Quechua puka red, qucha lake, "red lake") is a lake in the Vilcanota mountain range in Peru. It is situated in the Cusco Region, Quispicanchi Province, Ocongate District. Lake Pucacocha lies between Lake Singrenacocha in the north-west and Lake Huarurumicocha in the south-east. The small lakes north and south of it are called Alcacocha and Yanacocha.

References 

Lakes of Peru
Lakes of Cusco Region